The list of ship decommissionings in 1923 includes a chronological list of ships decommissioned in 1923.  In cases where no official decommissioning ceremony was held, the date of withdrawal from service may be used instead.


References

See also 

1923
 Ship decommissionings
 Ship launches
Ship launches